Terrain roller coasters are roller coasters which take advantage of the usually-natural undulations of the land upon which they are built. Such rides may often weave through forests, and some may even dive down cliffs. Because they tend to stay close to the ground, they require fewer supports and thus are usually cheaper than the same coaster on flat ground.

Famous examples 

 The Ultimate at Lightwater Valley is the longest terrain coaster in the world and second longest rollercoaster. Only the first lift hill (105 feet) is visible from the park, it then travels up and down natural hills until it reaches the second lift hill (107 feet), from which it plummets into the forested valley, using the banks, where it returns into the station after 7 minutes of ride time.
 Kennywood is situated in a hilly location in Pittsburgh. Many of its coasters take significant advantage of the topography, for example, the Thunderbolt's last drop is its longest one.
Boulder Dash is an out and back coaster that traverses the side of a mountain.
Holiday World is also known for its terrain roller coasters, most notably The Voyage.
The Beast at Kings Island has been the longest wooden roller coaster in the world since it opened in 1979.
Vortex at Canada's Wonderland is a terrain roller coaster, due to the influences of the ride track by Wonder Mountain and the river.
SooperDooperLooper and Trailblazer at Hersheypark are known to use their terrain very well. Trailblazer's can be seen after the first drop and after the mid-course brake run. SooperDooperLooper, on the other hand, uses its terrain for the majority of the ride; from the first drop into the vertical loop, all the way to the final brake run with its helix.

References

External links
 A list of terrain roller coasters

Types of roller coaster